The Schlei (or ), more often referred to in English as the Sly Firth, is a narrow inlet of the Baltic Sea in Schleswig-Holstein in northern Germany. It stretches for approximately 20 miles (32 kilometers) from the Baltic near Kappeln and Arnis to the city of Schleswig. Along the Schlei are many small bays and swamps. It separates the Angeln peninsula to the north from the Schwansen peninsula to the south.

The important Viking settlement of Hedeby was located at the head of the firth (fjord), but was later abandoned in favor of the city of Schleswig. A museum has been built on the site, telling the story of the abandoned town.

Notes

Förden of Germany
Bays of Schleswig-Holstein